The 1974 Individual Ice Speedway World Championship was the ninth edition of the World Championship.

The winner was Milan Špinka of the Czechoslovakia.

Final 

 March 10
  Nassjo

References

Ice speedway competitions
Ice